Charles Austin Miles (January 7, 1868March 10, 1946) was a prolific American writer of gospel songs, who is best known for his 1912 hymn "In the Garden".

He studied at the Philadelphia College of Pharmacy and the University of Pennsylvania. In 1892, he ceased to practice  as a pharmacist. His first gospel song, "List! ’Tis Jesus’ Voice", was published by the Hall-Mack Company. He worked as editor and manager at Hall-Mack for 37 years. A resident of Pitman, New Jersey, Miles died on March 10, 1946, at Hahnemann Hospital in Philadelphia. He is buried in Hillcrest Memorial Park, Sewell, NJ.

He said, "It is as a writer of gospel songs I am proud to be known, for in that way I may be of the most use to my Master, whom I serve willingly although not as efficiently as is my desire". He wrote at least 398 songs, and the music to at least 8 more.

His best-known song may be "In the Garden" (1912); sometimes known by its first line, "I Come to the Garden Alone". It has been included in 210 hymnals, and recorded numerous times.

Songs 

 "Dwelling in Beulah Land" ( "God Bless Fiji") (1911)
 "List! ’Tis Jesus’ Voice" (a.k.a. "He's Watching and Waiting") (1894) 
 "In the Garden" (a.k.a. "I Come to the Garden Alone") (1912)
 "Sweeter as the Years Roll By" (1914)

References 

1868 births
1946 deaths
People from Lakehurst, New Jersey
People from Pitman, New Jersey
Gospel music composers
19th-century composers
20th-century composers
American Protestant hymnwriters
National anthem writers